2nd Marine Hazrat Rasul-i-Akram Brigade is a marines brigade of Islamic Republic of Iran Navy based in Jask, Hormozgan Province.

References 

Special forces of Iran
Iranian marine brigades
Hormozgan Province